LCJ is a three letter acronym which can refer to:
The Lord Chief Justice of England and Wales
The three letter IATA code for Łódź Władysław Reymont Airport in Poland.